The Lasco Lascoter was a 1920s Australian 6-seat passenger and mail carrier aircraft built by the Larkin Aircraft Supply Company (Lasco) at Coode Island, Victoria. It was the first Australian-designed and built airliner to be granted a Certificate of Airworthiness.

History

The Lascoter was a high-wing monoplane with a tubular steel structure, featuring a tailwheel undercarriage and a fully enclosed cabin for the passengers and the pilot. It flew for the first time on 25 May 1929; despite being damaged in a landing accident at Coode Island in May, it received its Certificate of Airworthiness on 22 July 1929. It was then put into service with Australian Aerial Services, an airline owned by Lasco, and used on an air mail route between Camooweal, Queensland and Daly Waters, Northern Territory. The Lascoter was used by Australian Aerial Services and its successors until being withdrawn from use in 1938; it was scrapped during World War II.

Operators
 Australian Aerial Services 
 New England Airways

Specifications

References

External links
 Flight magazine image of the Lascoter
 Images of the Lascoter

1920s Australian airliners
1920s Australian mailplanes
Lascoter
High-wing aircraft
Single-engined tractor aircraft
Aircraft first flown in 1929